Dulhan is a Pakistani drama serial telecast on Hum TV from 28 September 2020 from 29 March 2021. Produced by Momina Duraid of MD Productions, it stars Sami Khan, Sumbul Iqbal, Faizan Khawaja and Mashal Khan in lead roles. The drama serial aired a weekly episode on Mondays at 8pm.

Plot 
Amal is a young, beautiful student who works as salesgirl in a boutique. She lives with her father, her stepmother and her step-siblings. Her father loves her while her step-mother is just in greed of her job and her salary. She doesn't want Amal to marry and takes the same promise from her.

One instance, she happens to meet Mikaal a rich, handsome student at her university when he draws her portrait. Later he informs her about his romantic feelings towards her but she rejects his offer of friendship and as a result he proposes to her. However, she denies his proposal telling him that her mother doesn't want her to marry. Although Mikaal meets with Amal's father and gains his approval, thus the two get engaged without Amal's stepmother knowing.

However, at the time of her wedding night, the truth is revealed. Mikaal has a bet involving her with his cousin Shahmeer. In the past, Amal has slapped Shahmeer in public when he tried to force her to form a sexual relationship with him. Mikaal teased Shahmeer about the incident and hurt Shahmeer's ego. Shahmeer then challenged Mikaal to make Amal fall in love with him, and placed his expensive convertible on a bet with him should he be successful in doing so.

In present, Shahmeer enters in room instead of Mikaal and reveals the truth to Amal. A horrified Amal hits him with a vase, knocking him unconscious when he tries to rape her. She reaches her home and informs her father about the incident and insists the marriage being a misunderstanding. Realizing his daughter's misfortune and his haste act to get her a decent suitor went down the drain, he dies in shock. Their image is also tainted as the neighbourhood is reported to have seen Amal yeeting down the street dressed as a bride early in the morning.

Mikaal also learns of it from Shahmeer. It is also revealed that Mikaal is engaged to Ainee who is Shahmeer's sister. Both headstrong and possessive, it could also be derived that she doubts Mikaal on certain occasions. Meanwhile, a devastated Amal remains traumatized due to the incident and struggles to get her life together to support her family.

Mikaal starts feeling guilty with the passing time about what he did to Amal, an innocent girl, and seems confused about his feelings. Meanwhile, Shahmeer harasses Amal at the boutique and later makes a move to kidnap her. Fortunately, Mikaal arrives on time and saves her resulting in both men getting into fight over her. Amal runs away and Mikaal agrees to give Shahmeer his expensive convertible back upon the condition that he would leave Amal, however Shahmeers egoistic insistence fails to reach amends with Mikaal and he hatches further plans.

Another unsuccessful strike at abducting Amal by Shahmeer results in Amal leaving her job and instead reaching another boutique recommended by her best friend Farnaaz. Much to her dismay, the boutique she seems to have been employed at is owned by Mikaal's mother, Kulsoom, and she does not seem to be aware of it before being assigned as a helper for Mikaal's wedding with Ainee at his house. Amal remains doubtful of his intentions when he tries to convince her that he wants only to protect her from Shahmeer and his ill plottings. He offers her a residency insurance and a thick bank balance beguiled by his guilt towards her, but she refuses all his amending facilities for an open divorce via a video confession. However, a confused and flustered Mikaal leaves uncomprehensive and sticking to his denial of nikaah (marriage) with her.

Later at Mikaal's wedding with Ainee, Amal is heavily oppressed by sorrow & heartbreak, and confesses to everyone in the wedding hall about how Mikaal had married her before Ainee and was her husband. However, a dumbfounded Mikaal, upon interrogation denies he had anything at all to do with her, so to speak. Everyone at the occasion is surprised as well as disturbed, Ainee out of all, is deeply shattered but upon her father's polite questioning as to whether she wants to marry him or not, agrees to it anyway for the sake of her family and their honor. Although on the wedding night, she assures Mikaal that she still doubts his intentions and would not give in to him unless she is validated off her suspicions. A week passes by and Amal finds herself jobless, courtesy of Kulsoom polluting her reputation as a gold digger for good.

Another day or two proves to be even more challenging for innocent Amal, a cash package is delivered at her door and she is enraged upon predicting this was Mikaals doing. After hiding it away safely, she rings Mikaal and degrades him for selling the truth at the value of mere cash, thinking he was the one who sent her the package of money. In the duration, Amal's stepmother overhears her and demands the money she was talking about. A forced and sorrowful Amal is then inclined to hand the money package to her greedy stepmother.

Meanwhile, Shahmeer plans his next move and upon an occurrence, barges into Amal, who is wandering places to find a stable job. He gives her his business card and persuades her to seek his help should she be unable to be employed. She however, perplexed in despising him, turns down the offer and leaves him hanging. Later she accepts the job.

Shahmeer offers 50 lakhs to Amal's stepmother and convinces her to let Amal marry him. Amal agrees and tells Mikaal about the same. On the other hand, Ainee leaves Mikaal's house and she goes back to her parents house. On the day of Amal and Shahmeer's marriage, Mikaal accepts that Amal is his wife and then he takes her away from the marriage. Shahmeer's father Haroon takes him away from the marriage.

Later, Amal's step sister Noshaba runs from house with her lover, only to be deceived by him as he leaves her alone and takes away all the money. Amal and Mikaal are in a safehouse. Kulsoom asks him about his whereabouts but he refuses. Shahmeer tracks their location eventually.

Mikaal and Shahmeer's altercation eventually results in Shahmeer's death. Before being arrested, Mikaal tells Kulsoom to take care of Amal. Shahmeer dies thus leaving his parents-Haroon and Khadija and his sister Ainee in shock

Noshaba comes back to home and repents for her mistakes. Amal refuses to forgive Mikaal and so Mikaal receives a three-year prison sentence. Kulsoom apologizes to Amal. A year passes and Amal has started her own boutique in her house along with her friend Farnaz and Noshaba. She receives a letter from Mikaal where he asks for an apology to which she replies that she needs time since she doesn't want to marry anyone after the experience of being his Dulhan.

Cast 
Sami Khan as Mikaal, Amal and Aine's husband
Sumbul Iqbal as Amal Mirza. Mikaal's first wife
Faizan Khawaja as Shahmeer, Mikaal's cousin and Aine's brother
Mashal Khan as Annie, Mikaal's second wife
Annie Zaidi as Khadija, Shahmeer's and Annie's mother, Kulsoom's sister-in-law
Shaheen Khan as Kulsoom, Mikaal's mother and Haroon's sister
Shehryar Zaidi as Haroon, Annie's and Shahmeer's father, Kulsoom's brother
Syed Mohammad Ahmed as Amal's father (dead) 
Farah Nadir as Elnaz's mother
Hina Shahid
Nida Mumtaz as Amal's stepmother
Laiba Imran as Noushaba
Haleema Ali

Production 
Khan revealed about his upcoming project through his instagram on 8 September 2020. Initial two teasers of the show were released on 13 September 2020.

Controversy
On airing a few initial episodes, it revealed that the serial has a problematic storyline as it romanticises harassment.

Soundtrack 

 
The official soundtrack of the serial has been composed by Waqar Ali and sung by Zeb Bangash while the lyrics were penned by Sabir Zafar. It was return of the singer on the channel, since she performed the OST of  Sammi Jag Khed'da Phire Mere Naal in 2017.

See also 
 List of programs broadcast by Hum TV

References

External links 
 Official website

2020 Pakistani television series debuts
Hum TV original programming
MD Productions
Pakistani television series
Urdu-language television shows
2020s romance television series